Gibberula columnella is a species of very small sea snail, a marine gastropod mollusk or micromollusk in the family Cystiscidae.

Description

Distribution
This species occurs in the Southern Atlantic off Angola.

References

 Dautzenberg, P., 1912. Mission GRUVEL sur la côte occidentale d'Afrique (1909-1910), Mollusques marins. Annales de l'Institut Océanographique "1913"5(3): 111 p, 3 pls
 Gofas, S.; Afonso, J.P.; Brandào, M. (Ed.). (S.a.). Conchas e Moluscos de Angola = Coquillages et Mollusques d'Angola. [Shells and molluscs of Angola]. Universidade Agostinho / Elf Aquitaine Angola: Angola. 140 pp.

Endemic fauna of Angola
columnella
Gastropods described in 1913